"So Many Men – So Little Time", or "So Many Men, So Little Time", is a song by Canadian singer Miquel Brown, which was a hit in 1983.

Lyrics
It is a song about "a woman sleeping with countless men and waking in the morning unaware of the name of the person sharing her bed".

History
Ian Levine and Fiachra Trench wrote this song specifically for the London gay club Heaven, where Levine worked as a DJ.

Levine remembers:

Нeritage
The song, along with Evelyn Thomas' "High Energy", played an important role in the evolution of disco into hi-NRG.

Charts

Weekly charts

Year-end charts

References

External links
 

1983 songs
1983 singles
Miquel Brown songs
Songs written by Ian Levine
Songs written by Fiachra Trench
Song recordings produced by Ian Levine
Songs